Wolves on the Border is a novel by Robert N. Charrette published by ROC in 1989, and again in 1996.

Plot summary
Wolves on the Border is a BattleTech novel set in the 3020s, which revolves around Minobu Tetsuhara, a Mechwarrior and Samurai of the Draconis Combine, and the infamous mercenary unit Wolf's Dragoons.

Reception
Andy Butcher reviewed Wolves on the Border for Arcane magazine, rating it a 7 out of 10 overall. Butcher comments that "Wolves On The Border compares very favourably to Charrette's Shadowrun novels, effectively capturing the atmosphere of the Battletech universe."

References

1989 novels
BattleTech novels